Maggie Davies (born 2 October 1984) is a British skeleton racer who has competed since 2004. Her best Skeleton World Cup finish was seventh at Winterberg in February 2008.

Davies' best finish at the FIBT World Championships was ninth in the women's event at Altenberg in 2008.

References
 FIBT profile

External links
 

1984 births
British female skeleton racers
Living people